Claudia Goldin (born May 14, 1946) is an American economic historian and labor economist who is currently the Henry Lee Professor of Economics at Harvard University. She is a co-director of the NBER's Gender in the Economy Study Group and was the director of the NBER’s Development of the American Economy program from 1989 to 2017. Goldin's research covers a wide range of topics, including the female labor force, the gender gap in earnings, income inequality, technological change, education, and immigration. Most of her research interprets the present through the lens of the past and explores the origins of current issues of concern. Her recently completed book Career & Family: Women's Century-Long Journey toward Equity (Princeton University Press) was released on October 5, 2021. 

Goldin was the president of the American Economic Association in the 2013–14 academic year. 
In 1990, Goldin became the first tenured woman at Harvard's economics department.

Early life and education

Goldin was born in New York City in 1946 to a Jewish family and grew up in the Parkchester housing complex in the Bronx. As a child, she was determined to become an archeologist, but upon reading Paul de Kruif's The Microbe Hunters (1927) in junior high school, she became drawn to bacteriology.  As a high school junior, she completed a summer school course in microbiology at Cornell University and after graduating from the Bronx High School of Science she entered Cornell University with the intention of studying microbiology. 

In her sophomore year, she took a class with Alfred Kahn, "whose utter delight in using economics to uncover hidden truths did for economics what Paul de Kruif's stories had done for microbiology." She became fascinated by regulation and industrial organization, the topics that interested Kahn, and she wrote her senior thesis on the regulation of communications satellites. After earning her B.A. in economics from Cornell, Goldin entered the PhD program in economics at the University of Chicago with the intention of studying industrial organization. She began her doctoral program in that field, but after Gary Becker came to Chicago she added labor economics and then gravitated to economic history with Robert W. Fogel. She wrote her PhD dissertation on slavery in US antebellum cities and in southern industry. She received a PhD in 1972. After graduate school, Goldin taught at the University of Wisconsin–Madison, Princeton University, and the University of Pennsylvania before joining the economics department at Harvard University in 1990, where she was the first woman to be offered tenure in that department.

Career
Directly after graduate school, Goldin taught at the University of Wisconsin, Madison. She moved to Princeton University in 1972 and to the University of Pennsylvania in 1979, where she became a tenured full professor. She joined the economics department at Harvard University in 1990, where she was the first woman to be offered tenure in that department. Goldin has been an NBER affiliate ever since 1978.

Goldin was the president of the American Economic Association in 2013/14 and the president of the Economic History Association in 1999/2000. She has been elected fellow of numerous organizations, including the American Academy of Political and Social Science, the Society of Labor Economists, the Econometric Society, and the American Academy of Arts and Sciences. She is a member of sections 53 and 54 of the National Academy of Sciences. She has received several honorary doctorates including the University of Nebraska, Lund University, the European University Institute, and the University of Zurich. She was an editor of the Journal of Economic History, from 1984 to 1988, and the editor of the NBER Long-term Factors in Economic Development Monograph Series from 1990 to 2017.

In 2015, with funding from the Alfred P. Sloan Foundation, Goldin initiated the Undergraduate Women in Economics (UWE) Challenge to understand why the fraction female among undergraduate majors in economics was low. She ran a randomized controlled trial using twenty institutions as treatments and others as controls to see if low-cost interventions could increase the number of female economics majors.

Research
Goldin is best known for her historical work on women and the economy. Her most influential papers in that area have concerned the history of women's quest for career and family, coeducation in higher education, the impact of the “Pill” on women's career and marriage decisions, women's surnames after marriage as a social indicator, the reasons why women are now the majority of undergraduates, and the new lifecycle of women's employment. 

Goldin began her career researching the history of the US southern economy. Her first book, Urban Slavery in the American South, had been her PhD dissertation at the University of Chicago. Together with the late Frank Lewis, she wrote the widely cited paper “The Economic Cost of the American Civil War” (1978). She later worked with the Kenneth Sokoloff on early industrialization in the US and the role of female workers, child labor, and immigrant and working-class families. At that point, she realized that female workers had been largely overlooked in economic history and she set out to study how the female labor force evolved and its role in economic growth. Her major papers from that research effort include “Monitoring Costs and Occupational Segregation by Sex” (1987), “Life Cycle Labor Force Participation of Married Women” (1989), and “The Role of World War II in the Rise of Women's Employment” (1991). Her book Understanding the Gender Gap: An Economic History of American Women (1990) told the story of the rise of women's employment in the US from the eighteenth century to the late twentieth century, its role in economic growth, and why gender gaps have existed in earnings and employment and continue to exist.

After writing her book on the economic history of the female labor force, Goldin set out to research the history of US education. She began with a series of articles on the high school movement and the shaping of higher education in the US that culminated in her Economic History Association presidential address, “The Human Capital Century and American Leadership: Virtues of the Past” (2001). She then worked with Lawrence Katz to understand the history of economic inequality in America and its relationship to educational advances. Their research produced many papers on the subject and was capped by the publication of The Race between Education and Technology (2008). The pairing also worked together in determining the value of a college education in the labor market through their 2016 paper "The Value of Postsecondary Credentials in the Labor Market: An Experimental Study".

Goldin continued to work on various topics of current concern, and many became part of volumes she jointly edited. These include the origins of immigration restriction, the creation of US unemployment insurance, and the role of the press in reducing corruption. 

During those years, she was also working on a series of important papers on gender. “Orchestrating Impartiality: The Effect of ‘Blind’ Auditions on Female Musicians” (with Rouse, 2000) is among her most highly cited papers. “The Power of the Pill: Oral Contraceptives and Women's Career and Marriage Decisions” (with Katz, 2002) and “The U-Shaped Female labor Force Function in Economic Development and Economic History,” (1995) are some of her pioneering papers. She then began to focus on college women's quest for career and family and the reasons for the persistent gender gap in earnings. Her American Economic Association presidential address, “A Grand Gender Convergence: Its Last Chapter” set forth what the last chapter must contain for there to be equality between men and women in the labor market. Her book Career & Family: Women's Century-Long Journey toward Equity contains the full history and concludes with the impact of the pandemic on women's careers and couple equity.

Personal life
Goldin is married to fellow Harvard economist Lawrence F. Katz. She has had Golden Retrievers ever since 1970, starting with Kelso. Pika, their current dog, has been widely recognized for his award in competitive scenting, was trained for obedience competitions, and has been a therapy dog at a local nursing home. Goldin and Katz are avid birders and hikers.

Awards
2005 Carolyn Shaw Bell Award from the American Economic Association.
2008 R.R . Hawkins Award, The Professional and Scholarly Publishing Division of the Association of American Publishers.
2008 The Richard A. Lester Award for the Outstanding Book in Industrial Relations and Labor Economics.
2009 The Richard A. Lester Award for the Outstanding Book in Industrial Relations and Labor Economics.
2009 Mincer Prize from the Society of Labor Economists
2009 The John R. Commons Award from Omicron Delta Epsilon, the economics honor society.
2016 IZA Prize in Labor Economics "for her career-long work on the economic history of women in education and the labor market."
2019 BBVA Foundation Frontiers in Knowledge Award in the category of Economics, Finance, and Management for her contributions to gender gap analysis.
Clarivate Citation Laureate in Economics
2020 Erwin Plein Nemmers Prize in Economics.
2021 Society for Progress Medal
2021 Richard A. Lester Book Award for the Outstanding Book in Industrial Relations and Labor Economics
2022 Visionary Award from the Council for Economic Education

Selected works
Goldin, Claudia Dale. Understanding the Gender Gap: An Economic History of American Women. New York: Oxford University Press, 1990, .
Goldin, Claudia Dale et al. Strategic Factors in Nineteenth Century American Economic History: A Volume to Honor Robert W. Fogel. Chicago: University of Chicago Press, 1992, .
Goldin, Claudia Dale and Gary D. Libecap. Regulated Economy: A Historical Approach to Political Economy. Chicago: University of Chicago Press, 1994, .
Bordo, Michael D., Claudia Dale Goldin, and Eugene Nelson White. The Defining Moment: The Great Depression and the American Economy in the Twentieth Century. Chicago: University of Chicago Press, 1998, .
Glaeser, Edward L. and Claudia Dale Goldin. Corruption and Reform: Lessons from America's History. Chicago: University of Chicago Press, 2006, .
Goldin, Claudia Dale and Lawrence F. Katz. The Race Between Education and Technology. Cambridge, Mass.: Belknap Press of Harvard University Press, 2008, .
Goldin, Claudia and Lawrence F. Katz. Women Working Longer: Increased Employment at Older Ages. Chicago: University of Chicago Press, 2018. 
Goldin, Claudia. Career & Family: Women's Century-Long Journey toward Equity. Princeton, NJ. Princeton University Press, 2021.

Recent articles
“Extending the Race between Education and Technology” (with D. Autor and L. Katz), American Economic Review, Papers and Proceedings 110 (May 2020), pp. 347- 51. 
“Watersheds in Child Mortality: The Role of Effective Water and Sewerage Infrastructure, 1880 to 1920” (with M. Alsan), Journal of Political Economy 127(2, 2018), pp. 586-638. 
“The New Lifecycle of Women's Employment: Disappearing Humps, Sagging Middles, Expanding Tops” (with J. Mitchell), Journal of Economic Perspectives 31 (Winter 2017), pp. 161-82.
“A Grand Gender Convergence: Its Last Chapter,” American Economic Review 104 (April 2014), pp. 1091-119.
“A Pollution Theory of Discrimination: Male and Female Differences in Occupations and Earnings.” In L. Boustan, C. Frydman, and R. Margo, Human Capital and History: The American Record (Chicago: University of Chicago Press, 2014), pp. 313-48.
“The ‘Quiet Revolution’ That Transformed Women's Employment, Education, and Family,” American Economic Review, Papers and Proceedings, (Ely Lecture), 96 (May 2006), pp. 1-21

References

External links
Claudia Goldin Curriculum vitae
The Economist as Detective, a brief autobiographical essay by Claudia Goldin. In: M. Szenberg (ed.). Passion and Craft: Economists at Work. Ann Arbor: University of Michigan Press, 1998, .
Academic Papers by Claudia Goldin.
Interview with Goldin by The Region of the Minneapolis Fed

1946 births
Living people
Cornell University alumni
University of Chicago alumni
Harvard University faculty
Jewish American economists
20th-century American economists
21st-century American economists
Economic historians
American women economists
Labor economists
Gender studies academics
Education economists
Members of the American Philosophical Society
Fellows of the American Academy of Arts and Sciences
Fellows of the Econometric Society
Presidents of the American Economic Association
Distinguished Fellows of the American Economic Association
Presidents of the Economic History Association